Benerib was a queen consort of ancient Egypt from First Dynasty. Benerib's name means "sweet(bene) of heart(ib)".

Biography 

Benerib was a wife of pharaoh Hor-Aha, but she was not the mother of his heir, Djer. The mother of king Djer is named as Khenthap, another wife of Hor-Aha. Benerib is thought to be the wife of Hor-Aha based on ivories found in her tomb at Abydos which show his name. A fragment of an ivory box with the names of Hor-Aha and Benerib was also found at Abydos and is now in the Boston Museum of Fine Arts.

Egyptologist John Romer argued that Benerib's name, which can be translated to "sweetheart" or "one who is pleasant at heart", may not even be a name at all but rather a title or epithet for a person whose sex is also not confirmed by the name.

Benerib's titles are not known, and neither is the identity of her parents.

Benerib was buried at Umm el-Qa'ab in tomb B14.

References 

31st-century BC women
Queens consort of the First Dynasty of Egypt
Hor-Aha